Closer is an EP by Christian rock act Jars of Clay. It was released in digital download format on July 29, 2008 and in CD format on August 19, 2008. The only radio single released off the EP is the title track, although the new recording of "Love Song for a Savior" has been known to be played by radio stations in place of the original single. Both "Closer" and "Safe to Land" would later appear on the band's 2009 album The Long Fall Back to Earth, but the version of "Closer" is a slightly different mix than the original version from the EP. The song "Prisoner of Hope" is a track from the soundtrack to the motion picture Sons of Lwala.

Track listing
"Closer" – 3:39
"Safe to Land" – 4:47
"Love Song for a Savior" – 4:54
"Flood (New Rain)" – 3:42
"Prisoner of Hope" – 4:04

References

External links
Jars of Clay official website

2008 EPs
Jars of Clay EPs
Gray Matters EPs